Queensland Cricketers' Club is a social members' club in Woolloongabba, Queensland, Australia, located at the famous Gabba Ground where cricket and Australian Rules Football are played. It was founded in 1959.

See also

References

External links
 

Australian club cricket teams
Sports teams in Queensland
Cricket in Queensland
1990 establishments in Australia
Cricket clubs established in 1990
Sporting clubs in Brisbane